The Idlib Martyrs' Brigade (Liwa Shuhada Idlib) was an armed rebel group that fought against the Syrian government in the Idlib Governorate of Syria. It first operated under the name Syrian Liberation Army, but had renamed itself by the end of April 2012. It was a loose coalition of localized forces, mostly composed of armed Syrian civilians who joined the uprising.

History

The group was based in Idlib Governorate and was primarily concerned with trying to expel government forces from the governorate, with the Idlib Martyrs' Brigade claiming that they, and not the better equipped Free Syrian Army, are doing the majority of the fighting in Idlib province. The brigade only appears to be active in Idlib province.

One of the group's primary problems was the fact that it was incredibly difficult for it to secure weapons and ammunition. This in turn severely hampered its recruitment and its ability to carry out attacks on Syrian government forces. The group has claimed that up to 7,100 people were ready to join the group but were prevented from doing so due to lack of weaponry and equipment. This shortage resulted in the group placing greater emphasis on roadside bombings using cheaper, homemade bombs, to fight the government.

The group also refused to abide by the Kofi Annan brokered ceasefire with Haitham Qudeimati, the group's spokesman, stating that any lull in the fighting on their part would only be due to a lack of weaponry.

On 5 November 2012, the head of the Idlib Martyrs' Brigade, Basil Eissa, along with at least 20 other rebels were killed in an airstrike by the Syrian Air Force.

On 9 December 2013, the Idlib Martyrs' Brigade alongside 13 other rebel groups formed the Syrian Revolutionaries Front. In September 2014 conflict erupted between the SRF and the al-Nusra Front in the Idlib Governorate. A number of fighters from the Idlib Martyrs' Brigade were killed in the fighting.

See also
List of armed groups in the Syrian Civil War

References

Anti-government factions of the Syrian civil war
Anti-ISIL factions in Syria
Military units and formations established in 2012
Military units and formations disestablished in 2014